Mantello (Mantel in lombard) is a comune (municipality) in the Province of Sondrio in the Italian region of Lombardy, located about  northeast of Milan and about  west of Sondrio.

Mantello borders the following municipalities: Andalo Valtellino, Cercino, Cino, Cosio Valtellino, Dubino, Rogolo.

Demographic evolution

References

Cities and towns in Lombardy